Peter Armit (died 19 April 2013) was a Scottish professional footballer who played as a winger.

Career
Armit played for Broxburn Athletic, St Johnstone, Gloucester City, Stenhousemuir and Hamilton Academical.

References

1920s births
2013 deaths
Scottish footballers
Broxburn Athletic F.C. players
St Johnstone F.C. players
Gloucester City A.F.C. players
Stenhousemuir F.C. players
Hamilton Academical F.C. players
Scottish Football League players
Association football wingers
Year of birth missing
Place of birth missing